Walmor Oliveira de Azevedo (born 26 April 1954) is a prelate of the Roman Catholic Church. He served as auxiliary bishop of São Salvador da Bahia from 1998 till 2004, when he became archbishop of Belo Horizonte. In 2010 he also became bishop for the Brazilian ordinariate for the faithful of eastern rite. In May 2019, he became head of the Brazilian Bishops conference.

Biography
Born in Cocos, Oliveira de Azevedo was ordained to the priesthood on 9 September 1977, serving in Juiz de Fora.

On 21 January 1998, he was appointed auxiliary bishop of São Salvador da Bahia and titular bishop of Caliabria. Oliveira de Azevedo received his episcopal consecration on the following 10 May from Lucas Cardinal Moreira Neves, archbishop of São Salvador da Bahia, with the archbishop of Juiz de Fora, Clóvis Frainer, and the bishop of Luz, Eurico dos Santos Veloso, serving as co-consecrators.

On 28 January 2004, he was appointed Archbishop of Belo Horizonte. He was installed on the following 26 March. Pope Benedict XVI named him a member of the Congregation for the Doctrine of the Faith on 22 September 2009. On 28 July 2010 he also became bishop for the Brazilian ordinariate for the faithful of eastern rite.

Pope Francis named him a member of the Congregation for the Oriental Churches on 19 February 2014.

On 6 May 2019 he was elected president of the Episcopal Conference of Brazil.

He has held these positions in the Conference:
1999-2003 Member of the commission for the Doctrine of the Faith
Since 2003 Chairman of the commission for the Doctrine of the Faith
2007 Representative for the fifth general conference of the Latin American Episcopal Conference in Aparecida
Chairman of region Leste 2 of the Brazilian Bishops conference
Since 2019 Chairman of the Brazilian Bishops conference

Principal consecrator 
He was principal consecrator of the following bishops:
 Aloísio Jorge Pena Vitral
 Joaquim Giovanni Mol Guimarães
 Luis Gonzaga Féchio
 Wilson Luís Angotti Filho
 João Justino de Medeiros Silva

He was principal co-consecrator of the following bishops:
 Eduardo Benes de Sales Rodrigues
 José Francisco Rezende Dias
 Dominique Marie Jean Denis You
 João Carlos Petrini
 Josafá Menezes da Silva

Honors 
14 May 2009 honorary citizen of the state of Minas Gerais
7 March 2010 honorary citizen of the city of Ribeirão das Neves
21 March 2010 honorary diploma of the city of Belo Horizonte
16 December 2010 honorary citizen of the city of Caeté

References

External links 

 Entry about Walmor Oliveira de Azevedo at catholic-hierarchy.org 

1954 births
20th-century Roman Catholic bishops in Brazil
21st-century Roman Catholic archbishops in Brazil
Living people
People from Bahia
Roman Catholic bishops of São Salvador da Bahia